Hesar-e Pahlavanlu (also Romanized as Ḩeşār-e Pahlavānlū and Ḩeşār-e Pahlevānlū; also known as Ḩeşār-e Golīān and Ḩeşār-e Gelīān) is a village in Golian Rural District, in the Central District of Shirvan County, North Khorasan Province, Iran. At the 2006 census, its population was 663, in 176 families.

References 

Populated places in Shirvan County